Barrowhouse may refer to:

 Barrowhouse, County Laois, a townland in County Laois, Ireland
 Barrowhouse GAA, a Gaelic Athletic Association club located in Barrowhouse